Viva la Vida or Death and All His Friends, often referred to as simply Viva la Vida, is the fourth studio album by British rock band Coldplay, released on 12 June 2008 on the Parlophone label. "Viva la vida" is a Spanish phrase that translates into English as "long live life", "live the life", or simply "live life" (lit. "the life lives"). Lyrically, the album contains references to love, life, death and war.

Recording sessions for the album took place from June 2007 to April 2008 and featured production by Jon Hopkins, Rik Simpson, Markus Dravs, and Brian Eno. The album was Coldplay's first to be produced by Eno, and also their first album to not be produced by long-time Coldplay producer Ken Nelson. The band forced themselves to explore new styles, as Eno required every song on the album to sound different. Development of the album delayed the release date several times. The album cover of Viva la Vida is the 1830 painting Liberty Leading the People by Eugène Delacroix.

Viva la Vida was both a critical and commercial success. Five songs were released in promotion of the album: "Violet Hill" and "Viva la Vida" in May 2008, "Lovers in Japan" and "Lost!" in November 2008, and "Strawberry Swing" in September 2009. "Viva la Vida" became the band's first song to reach number one in both the United States and the United Kingdom. It won Best Rock Album at the 2009 Grammy Awards and was also nominated for Album of the Year. It was the best-selling album of 2008. By 2011, the album had sold more than 10 million copies worldwide. Viva la Vida was re-released on 25 November 2008 in a deluxe edition containing the original album and the Prospekt's March EP, which contained another hit, "Life in Technicolor II".

Background
In October 2006, two weeks after bass guitarist Guy Berryman had a child, reports circulated that the band were taking a five-year hiatus. The new baby, and the fact that Coldplay had no touring or recording schedule at the time, had fans wondering if the band's new album would not be released until 2010. Dispelling such reports, Ambrosia Healy, spokesperson to Capitol Records, sent an e-mail message to MTV saying that there was no self-imposed hiatus. However, Healy clarified that Coldplay was indeed "enjoying a much-deserved break", and that there was no timetable for the follow-up to the band's third studio album, X&Y.

Work on the album began in November 2006, only being interrupted by the Latin American leg of their Twisted Logic Tour in early 2007.

Recording

Ambient musician and English record producer Brian Eno produced the album. Coldplay moved to "The Bakery", after finishing up their Twisted Logic Tour, building a studio there. The songs written during their time at the studio are lyrically "much more abstract, much more visual than before", and musically "less straight-forward, more oblique". Additionally, lead singer Chris Martin wanted to make a vocal transition from his trademark falsetto to a lower register. This is explored in "Yes", where the main characteristic of the Velvet Underground–inspired song is the lowest vocals Chris Martin ever recorded; this was suggested by the producer Brian Eno, to make every single song sound different. The band's drummer Will Champion said in an interview for MTV: "One of the main things we tried to focus on with this record is changing vocal identities, because Chris has a very recognizable voice." Coldplay sparked an interest with Hispanic influences after having recorded in churches and in Spanish-speaking countries such as in Mexico in North America and Spain in Europe, specifically in Barcelona. However, it was stressed that the influence was not in any specific sound but a general feel to the songs taken as a whole. On their website, the band also described taking acoustic guitars and basic recording equipment to churches and experimenting with particular sounds.

Throughout the recording of the album, Coldplay communicated to fans through their website. "Famous Old Painters" and "Glass of Water" were written in late 2007, and they were considering both tracks for the album; however, they were not well received by the producers, though the latter was added to the finalized Prospekt's March extended play track listing instead. The album was delayed further, but a December 2007 post gave hints that the recording stage was nearly finished. The article was signed "Prospekt", strengthening rumours that this would be the album's title. While the band completed two more songs ("Lovers in Japan" and "Strawberry Swing"), they denied that the album was called "Prospekt". Martin revealed he had been reading many Charles Dickens novels during the recording process which may have contributed to the strong visual imagery on such tracks as "Violet Hill" and "Cemeteries of London". 

When asked about why "Lovers in Japan/Reign of Love" had an additional song, bassist Guy Berryman explained that the band had wanted to keep the album concise with a total of ten tracks. Champion followed with, "We just preferred to have less titles and more stuff. The album as a whole has got the most on it, but it's the shortest. We wanted to make it almost impossible for you to not listen to it all in one go."

The Italian violinist and composer Davide Rossi collaborated with Coldplay to record strings on his acoustic and electric violin (the latter being capable of reaching notes as low as the upright bass, thus recreating a full orchestra) throughout the album. His strings are featured in six songs: "Viva la Vida" (the song in which his strings are the most used), "Violet Hill", "Life in Technicolor", "42", "Yes" and "Strawberry Swing". Some of the songs they recorded with Rossi didn't make the cut for the album but were released on the Prospekt's March EP.

On 18 July 2009, two early demos from the Viva la Vida recording sessions leaked onto the Internet: the previously unheard "Bloodless Revolution" and a very early version of Viva la Vida promotional single "Lovers in Japan". A day later another demo, called "St. Stephen", appeared online. On 20 July 2009, six more demos were leaked: "The Fall of Man", "The Man Who Swears", "The Man Who Swears II" (actually just the second half of "The Man Who Swears"), "First Steps", "Loveless" and "Goodbye and Goodnight". Three other left-off tracks were leaked later into the internet: an instrumental of "Lukas", an unreleased song given to Natalie Imbruglia; "Solid Ground (Until The Water Floats Over)", a song written and performed live in 2006; and an instrumental of "Famous Old Painters".

Composition and themes
Viva la Vida is a rock album, which has been more specifically described as alternative rock, art rock, pop rock, indie pop and art pop, with dream pop influences. Musically, it contrasts with their previous records. The title track uses an orchestra, while "Lovers in Japan" features a tack piano. "Lost!" is influenced by tribal music, whereas "Strawberry Swing" incorporates Afropop music. Martin described Viva la Vida as a new direction for Coldplay: a change from their past three albums, which they have referred to as a "trilogy". He said the album featured less falsetto, as he allowed his voice's lower register to take precedence, which is particularly evident on such tracks as "Yes" and "Death and All His Friends".

The album contains an array of different themes such as love, war, and revolution. Unlike their previous releases, the album has a more universal approach, dealing less with personal problems and more with issues of humanity. Songs like "Life in Technicolor II" (which didn't make it to the final track list but instead was released on Prospekt's March) and "Death and All His Friends" talk about war and politics, while "Violet Hill" has been described as the first anti-war protest song from the band. Martin stated the lyrics of "Violet Hill" were a commentary on Fox News. Other songs, such as the double track "Lovers in Japan/Reign of Love" and "Yes", are about love and desire.

Revolutionary themes are also an important part of the album and its promotion. Coldplay used customized French revolutionary costumes throughout the Viva la Vida Tour and in the videos produced for the album's singles. In an interview for the Latin American TV channel Boomerang in 2010, Martin said that a big inspiration for the record was Victor Hugo's book Les Misérables—which can be noted by the French revolution themes on "Viva la Vida", for example.

The work of the Beatles is apparently an inspiration throughout the album, starting with orchestration on the title track. The song "Violet Hill", with its distorted guitar riffs and bluesy undertones, references the Beatles' album Abbey Road (1969), being named after a street near Abbey Road and borrowing its rhythm from the Beatles. At the 2009 Grammy Awards, when accepting the award for Song of the Year, Will Champion joked: "I'd like to say, first of all, thank you and sorry to Sir Paul McCartney for blatantly recycling the Sgt. Pepper outfits."

Artwork

The artwork for Viva la Vida or Death and All His Friends was designed by Coldplay and Tappin Gofton; the latter designed the X&Y cover three years earlier. The design style for the album took months to be completed; it was initially developed from a set of large-scale sketches and paintings of expressive typography. Lyrics and song titles were boldly painted across old maps, books, copies of old paintings, newspapers and various sorts of second-hand things. The final work was photographed and some additional typography was later added by computer.

Almost all tracks from the album and the Prospekt's March EP have one or more graphic images. On the album's booklet there are nine paintings made by the band. The first is a blue map of Brazil that includes part of the lyrics from "Glass of Water" painted in white. However, the image was later reworked and used as the artwork for the "Lost!" single cover. The second painting on the booklet illustrates the song "42". The image consists of part of the song's composition written in a red background, with a black stripe covering the centre. The design for "Cemeteries of London" contains an illustration of London, the song's title and a messy violet background. A portion of the lyrics is used on the top of it. The visual design for "Reign of Love" has its lyrics drawn on a green background. In the middle of the booklet, most of the lyrics of the album are shown amidst an unrecognizable object. The artwork for "Yes" consists of a ripped heart, and a line from the song, "Lord lead me not into temptation". The painting next to the song's artwork contains lyrics from "Viva la Vida" painted in black on a blue background. The artwork for "Death and All His Friends" was made with scissors and paper. Lyrics for the song appear in the design. The last page in the booklet is simple: a Roman numeral of the number 7 painted in red and green on a yellow background. Some of the paintings were shown on a screen during the Viva la Vida Tour, or used on big balloons inside of the venues.

There were three covers for the album. The front cover for the standard edition is a painting by Eugène Delacroix, entitled Liberty Leading the People, which was slightly altered for the cover by using a white paint brush to draw "VIVA LA VIDA". The Prospekt's March Edition cover uses the same words again, but they are bigger and painted in gold on a solid black background. The cover for the Prospekt's March EP included another Eugène Delacroix painting, Battle of Poitiers, and had "Prospekt's March" drawn across the painting similarly to how "Viva la Vida" was drawn across Liberty Leading the People for the standard album cover. The cover used for the Asian Tour edition and has the word "VIVA" painted in red and black stripes against a white background; this same painting was used as the home page for the official Coldplay website for a while, and it was created by the band and painted by the drummer Will Champion on a wall at the studio called The Bakery.

Release and promotion
In a Rolling Stone magazine interview, vocalist Chris Martin announced the album's release date and its title, Viva la Vida, which is a Spanish phrase that translates into English as "long live life". It takes its name from a painting by Frida Kahlo, an acclaimed 20th-century Mexican artist. The album cover art is an 1830 painting by Eugène Delacroix titled Liberty Leading the People. On 10 April 2008, a new journal entry appeared on the band's website announcing the track list and release date, as well as hinting at new tracks to be issued before the album's release. "Violet Hill" was confirmed as the first single from Viva la Vida, with a release date of 5 May. In May 2008, Coldplay featured in an advertisement for Apple's iTunes with the song "Viva la Vida".

The band's official website was updated in late April to reveal the official Viva la Vida artwork as well as a free release of the single "Violet Hill", which became available for download for one week from 29 April 2008. The album was leaked around 5 June, so the band decided to make the album available to stream via their Myspace profile from 8:30 pm WEST on 6 June. On 25 June 2008, the band became the third band ever to perform on The Daily Show with Jon Stewart, performing "42" and "Lost!". On 27 June at 7:00 am EDT, Coldplay began a live outdoor performance for the Today Show on the streets outside of Rockefeller Plaza, New York. The band performed on the Late Show with David Letterman on 30 June and on The Tonight Show with Jay Leno on 17 July.

In August 2008, Coldplay announced they would be releasing an EP, Prospekt's March, consisting of unreleased material from the Viva la Vida recording sessions. The album was re-released on 25 November 2008 in a deluxe edition, titled Viva la Vida – Prospekt's March Edition. It contains tracks from the original album and Prospekt's March.

The stage setup for the Viva la Vida Tour consisted of a stripped-down main stage and two catwalks; Coldplay also performed amongst audience members at the back of venues in a special acoustic set. Instead of a giant video screen on-stage, the band opted for six hanging giant lightbulbs that displayed images and closeups. The band started the tour playing a concert at the Paradiso in the Netherlands, on 5 June 2008, and played their first UK show of the tour at Brixton Academy eleven days later on 16 June. Free shows at Madison Square Garden on 23 June, and they ended the tour in Barcelona. The tour ended in March 2010 in Latin America and consisted of 172 concerts. The tour grossed $116,684,354 ( terms).

Critical reception

Viva la Vida or Death and All His Friends received generally positive reviews from critics. On the review aggregator website Metacritic, the album has a weighted average score of 72 out of 100 based on 32 reviews, indicating "generally favorable reviews". Stephen Thomas Erlewine of Allmusic stated, "They demonstrate a focused concentration throughout this tight album – it's only 47 minutes yet covers more ground than X&Y and arguably A Rush of Blood to the Head – that turns Viva la Vida into something quietly satisfying." Chris Willman of Entertainment Weekly magazine rated the album "A−" and called it their best album, while Alexis Petridis of The Guardian, however, wrote a mixed review, explaining: "Viva la Vidas mild tinkering with the formula represents a failure of imagination: perhaps it's hard to think outside the box when the box is the size of the Las Vegas MGM Grand Garden Arena. Equally, however, there's a genuine conviction about its contents, a huge advance both on its predecessor and their legion of imitators." Will Hermes of Rolling Stone magazine wrote that "Coldplay's desire to unite fans around the world with an entertainment they can all relate to is the band's strength, and a worthy goal. But on Viva la Vida, a record that wants to make strong statements, it's also a weakness. Sometimes, to say what needs to be said, you need to risk pissing people off." Melodic magazine's critic Kaj Roth gave the album 4/5 and felt that "the typical Coldplay trademark is there too with beautiful atmospheric melodies that will embrace the heart". Spin magazine's critic Mikael Wood said in a positive review of the album, "For all of Coldplay's experimentation, though, there's no doubting that Viva la Vida, with its sturdy melodies and universal themes – think love, war and peace – is an album meant to connect with the masses (arenas have been built for less than the climax of "Death and All His Friends"). The band's triumph lies in how exciting they make that prospect seem". IGN gave the album 9.3/10, while Q said: "So some habits die hard, but on every other level Viva La Vida [...] is an emphatic success [...], radical in its own measured way but easy to embrace". Robert Christgau gave it a one-star honorable mention, saying: "Applying all his powers, Chris Martin successfully dilutes Radiohead, with — what else? Pleasant results".

The album won the Grammy Award for Best Rock Album at the 2009 Grammy Awards. It appeared in several Best Albums of 2008 lists, including New York Post (Number 1), Rolling Stone (Number 7), Q (Number 3), Spin (Number 9), Entertainment Weekly (Number 6), and Billboard (Number 6). Despite giving the album three stars out of five in The Times, Pete Paphides admitted in December 2008 that he was wrong to give it this score and had in fact become his favourite album of the year. Conversely, NME nominated the album for Worst Album at the 2009 NME Awards despite reviewing it with a 8/10 grade.

Rankings

Accolades

Commercial performance 

In its first week of release, Viva la Vida debuted at number one in 36 countries. It would later become the best-selling album of 2008 worldwide and the best-selling of the decade in the digital download format. The album sold 125,000 copies in its first day of release in the United Kingdom and 302,074 in three days, debuting at number one. During its second week, the record sold another 198,000 copies, achieving a platinum certification. After ten days, Viva la Vida surpassed the mark of 500,000 copies, beating the UK first-week sales of Coldplay's third album, X&Y. As of October 2021, it has sold 1,500,000 copies in the country.

It debuted with sales of 41,041 copies in Australia and has since been certified 4× platinum. In Canada, the album debuted at the top of the Canadian Albums Chart with 90,000 copies. It would remain at number one for five consecutive weeks, selling 176,000 copies within the first month and eventually being certified five-times platinum by the Canadian Recording Industry Association. In the United States, it sold 316,000 copies during its first day and 720,000 in its first week, holding down the number-one spot for two weeks and nearly equalling X&Y's debut of 737,000 copies. In October 2008, the album got certified double platinum by RIAA for a shipment of over two million copies, and as of August 2011 it has sold 2.8 million copies.

Legacy 
Shawn Cooke from Billboard considered Viva la Vida or Death and All His Friends the "last massive experimental rock album" when writing its tenth-anniversary review, mentioning how "We haven’t seen another super-popular, multi-platinum rock record with a No. 1 single really swing for the fences" ever since. It has also been branded as a transitional release, being "simultaneously the most Coldplay record, but also the most unlike anything they'd done before", as the band continued to explore new musical styles in subsequent albums. After citing them as one of his inspirations, American singer-songwriter and producer Finneas O'Connel noted that Viva la Vida is his favourite Coldplay record as well as one of the influences behind his sister Billie Eilish's When We All Fall Asleep, Where Do We Go? (2019).

Track listing
All tracks are written by Coldplay (Guy Berryman, Jonny Buckland, Will Champion, and Chris Martin) except where noted.

Notes
"Reign of Love" begins at 3:58.
"Chinese Sleep Chant" begins at 4:05.
"The Escapist" begins at 3:31.
"Life in Technicolor" and "The Escapist" contain a sample from "Light Through the Veins", written and performed by Jon Hopkins.

Personnel
Credits adapted from AllMusic.

 Chris Martin – lead vocals, acoustic guitar, piano, keyboards; rhythm guitar (on "Chinese Sleep Chant")
 Guy Berryman – bass guitar, synthesizers, santoor (on "Life in Technicolor"), backing vocals, photography
 Jonny Buckland – electric guitar, backing vocals, keyboard (on "Lost!" and "Viva la Vida")
 Will Champion – drums, percussion, backing vocals, piano

Additional personnel
 Michael Brauer – mixing
 François Chevallier – assistant engineer, engineer
 Coldplay – artwork
 Eugène Delacroix – cover painting
 Markus Dravs – mixing, producer
 Brian Eno – producer, sonic landscapes
 Olga Fitzroy – assistant engineer, engineer
 Tappin Gofton – art direction, design
 Dan Green – assistant engineer, engineer, photography
 Phil Harvey – manager
 William Paden Hensley – assistant engineer, engineer
 Dave Holmes – management
 Jon Hopkins – organ, harmonium, synthesizers, colouring, producer
 Mike Kezner – sitar
 Jason Lader – assistant engineer, engineer
 Bob Ludwig – mastering
 Dominic Monks – assistant engineer, engineer
 John O'Mahoney – mixing
 Vanessa Parr – assistant engineer, engineer
 Jan Petrov – assistant engineer, engineer
 Davide Rossi – electric violin, strings
 Andy Rugg – assistant engineer, engineer
 Rik Simpson – mixing, producer
 Brian Thorn – assistant engineer, engineer
 Michael Trepagnier – assistant engineer, engineer
 Andy Wallace – mixing

Charts

Weekly charts

Year-end charts

Decade-end charts

All-time charts

Certifications and sales

Release history

Notes

References

External links
 Viva la Vida or Death and All His Friends at Discogs
 

2008 albums
Albums produced by Brian Eno
Albums produced by Jon Hopkins
Albums produced by Markus Dravs
Albums produced by Rik Simpson
Capitol Records albums
Coldplay albums
Concept albums
Parlophone albums
Grammy Award for Best Rock Album
Juno Award for International Album of the Year albums